These are the results of the men's double sculls competition in rowing at the 2004 Summer Olympics.  In a sculling boat, each rower has two oars, one on each side of the boat. The Rowing events were held at the Schinias Olympic Rowing and Canoeing Centre.

Medalists

Heats
Fourteen boats raced in three heats on August 14.  The top three boats in each heat advanced to the semifinals, and the remaining boats moved to the repechage.

SF denotes qualification to semifinal
R denotes qualification to repechage

Heat 1

Heat 2

Heat 3

Repechage
The five boats that did not qualify for the semifinals directly from the heats raced in a single repechage race on August 17.  The top three boats qualified for the semifinals.

SF denotes qualification to semifinal

Semifinals
Twelve boats raced in two semifinals on August 18.
FA denotes qualification to final A
FB denotes qualification to final B

Semifinal A

Semifinal B

Finals
Final B was raced on August 19 and determined placings 8–12 in the event.  Final A was raced on August 21 and determined the medal winners.

Final A

Final B

References

External links
Official Olympic Report

Men's Double Sculls
Men's events at the 2004 Summer Olympics